The name Washi has been used to name two tropical cyclone in the Northwestern Pacific Ocean. The name was submitted by Japan and defines the constellation of Aquila. Also means “Japanese paper”.

Tropical Storm Washi (2005) (T0508, 08W) – impacted South China.
Severe Tropical Storm Washi (2011) (T1121, 27W, Sendong) – impacted southern Philippines and killed more than 1,000 people.

The name Washi was retired after the 2011 typhoon season and was replaced with the name Hato (Which means pigeon (Columba) in that same language).

Pacific typhoon set index articles